Denis Cregan (born 4 May 1940) is an Irish publican and former Fine Gael party politician from Cork, who served for 17 years as a senator.

A former branch vice-president of the Irish Transport and General Workers' Union, Cregan was a long-standing member of Cork City Council from 1979 to 2009, and was Lord Mayor of Cork from 1991 to 1992. He had unsuccessfully contested the Cork South-Central constituency at the 1981 and February 1982 general elections. He stood in the 1982 Seanad elections, winning a seat on the Labour Panel, which he held until his defeat in the 1989 elections to the 19th Seanad Éireann.

He was unsuccessful again when he stood again in Cork South-Central at the 1992 general election, but in the subsequent elections to the 20th Seanad he was re-elected on the Labour Panel. He was re-elected in 1997 to the 21st Seanad, but was narrowly defeated in the 2002 elections to the 22nd Seanad.

At the 2004 local elections, he held his seat on Cork City Council, though with a margin of less than 50 votes over the Sinn Féin candidate.

In January 2009 he announced his retirement from politics and did not contest the 2009 local elections.

He is well known in Cork for his chain of Fish and chip shops called Dino's.

References

1940 births
Living people
Fine Gael senators
Local councillors in Cork (city)
Lord Mayors of Cork
Members of the 16th Seanad
Members of the 17th Seanad
Members of the 18th Seanad
Members of the 20th Seanad
Members of the 21st Seanad